MasterChef Junior Thailand is a Thai competitive cooking game show that premiered in 2013 with the name Junior MasterChef Thailand. The series was adapted out of the British show Junior MasterChef.

In 2018, MasterChef Junior Thailand was brought back by Channel 7. The audition for new contestants was opened in 2018.

Changes
For the 2013 series, contestants are not eliminated every week, though four are eliminated at a time once the top 12 is decided. Every eliminated contestant also receives a range of prizes.

The premise for the 2018 revival remains similar to the adult version of MasterChef Thailand. However, there are multiple contestants eliminated per week, instead of just one.

Seasons

Season synopsis

Channel 3 version

Season 1 

The very first season of the show, was aired between 3 February 2013 and 2 June 2013. It featured 8-12 year old contestants, competing for Junior MasterChef Thailand title. The series was dropped by Channel 3 with only one season aired.

Channel 7 version

Season 1

The auditions for the first season of the revival series were opened in 2018. The age limit for the contestants was increased from 12 to 13 years old.

Season 2

See also
 MasterChef Thailand

References 

MasterChef Thailand
Thai reality television series
2013 Thai television series debuts
Thai television series based on British television series
Channel 3 (Thailand) original programming
Channel 7 (Thailand) original programming
Television series about children
Television series about teenagers